Ludmila Alexandrovna Kalinina is a  Russian pair skating coach. She was based in Perm until mid-2011 when she relocated to Saransk. Her students have included:

 Vera Bazarova / Yuri Larionov (spring 2005 to February 2013) Two-time European medalists, 2012 Grand Prix Final medalists.
 Elena Efaeva / Alexei Menshikov
 Alexei Rogonov
 Tatiana Tudvaseva / Sergei Lisiev

Kalinina has a degree in chemical engineering. She is married with two children.

References 

Living people
Sportspeople from Perm, Russia
Russian figure skating coaches
Female sports coaches
Year of birth missing (living people)